Penicillium rasile is a species of fungus in the genus Penicillium.

References 

rasile
Fungi described in 1979